Garden is a live album by Cecil Taylor recorded at Basel Switzerland, November 16, 1981 and released on the Hat Hut label. The album features seven solo performances by Taylor on a Bösendorfer grand piano and was originally released as a double LP in 1982 and then rereleased as two single CDs entitled Garden Part 1 and Garden Part 2 in 1990.

Reception
The Allmusic review by Thom Jurek states:

Track listing
All compositions by Cecil Taylor.
 "Elell" - 26:40
 "Garden II" - 24:40
 "Garden I + Stepping On Stars" - 20:10
 "Introduction To Z" - 8:15
 "Driver Says" - 3:20
 "Pemmican" - 6:20
 "Points" - 2:30
Recorded at Basel Switzerland, November 16, 1981

Personnel
Cecil Taylor: piano

References

1981 live albums
Cecil Taylor live albums
Hathut Records live albums
Solo piano jazz albums